The 2007 Lexmark Indy 300 was the thirteenth and penultimate round of the 2007 Champ Car World Series Season. It was held on 21 October 2007 on the Surfers Paradise Street Circuit in Queensland, Australia. The race was won by Sébastien Bourdais, who also claimed his fourth consecutive Champ Car title, becoming the first man to achieve that distinction.

Qualifying results

Oriol Servià, driving a car for PKV this weekend, nipped local hero Will Power on Friday, snagging the provisional pole position by .033 seconds and locking in a front row starting spot for Sunday's race.  Power got revenge on Saturday when he broke the Surfers Paradise track record in winning his fourth pole position of the season by .372 seconds.

Race

Will Power led away from the standing start, continuing to show the unmatched speed he showed in qualifying on Saturday.  But the Australian's race would quickly end in tears.  After debris brought out a caution flag on lap 9, Power led the front-runners into the pits for the first stop of the day. The lollipop man released Power back into the pit lane just as David Martínez was entering the pit stall in front of him.  Power ran into the back of Martínez's car, damaging his right front suspension.  Power was forced to return to the pits for repairs, leaving him at the back of the field.  Power's day ended for good on lap 19 when he clouted Katherine Legge while trying to pass her, leaving him with a broken car and a very sore wrist.

As is often the case in Champ Car races, the early debris caution led to three drivers rolling the dice on strategy.  Paul Tracy (who spun on lap 1), Bruno Junqueira (who had stalled on the grid), and Robert Doornbos (who had a lousy qualifying) stayed out rather than pit.  Doornbos led until he pitted on lap 18, with Paul Tracy leading for a lap until he drove for the pits on lap 19.

Sébastien Bourdais inherited the lead from Tracy.  Bourdais had jumped around Oriol Servià in the first pit stop.  Servià took the lead when Bourdais pitted on lap 32, who in turn gave up the lead on lap later to Paul Tracy, who was now leading the alternate strategy cars.

Bourdais was running in second behind Tracy until a rare event happened on lap 39, he was passed on the track by Justin Wilson.  So when Tracy pitted on lap 40 Wilson took over the lead.  Both Wilson and Bourdais had one more pit stop to make.  Wilson stopped first on lap 44, but Bourdais extended his stop until lap 48, setting down some scorching laps on low tanks in the meantime.  Bourdais easily came out in front of Wilson after completing his final pit stop.

With first and second places pretty much decided, an interesting battle was shaping up between alternate strategy runners Tracy and Junqueira for the final podium spot.  Tracy was looking to redeem a rough patch of races while Junqueira was looking for his third consecutive podium finish.  Unfortunately for Tracy, he used too much fuel to stay ahead and had to dive to the pits for fuel on the white flag lap.  To add insult to injury he stalled the car and ended the race in ninth, the last lead lap runner.

With the victory, Bourdais clinched his fourth consecutive Champ Car title, a feat that has never been done before.  He also became the first man to repeat as winner in the 17-year history of the Surfers Paradise event.

Race result

Caution flags

Notes

 New Track Record Will Power 1:30.054 (Qualification Session #2)
 New Lap Record Graham Rahal 1:31.093
 New Race Record Sébastien Bourdais 1:45:49.318
 Average Speed 96.669 mph

Championship standings after the race

 Bold indicates the Season Champion.
Drivers' Championship standings

 Note: Only the top five positions are included.

References

External links
 Full Weekend Times & Results
 Race Box Score

Lexmark Indy 300
Lexmark Indy 300
Gold Coast Indy 300